The 2012 UEFA European Football Championship, commonly referred to as UEFA Euro 2012 or simply Euro 2012, was the 14th European Championship for men's national football teams organised by UEFA. The final tournament, held between 8 June and 1 July 2012, was co-hosted by Poland and Ukraine (both first time hosts), and was won by Spain, who beat Italy 4–0 in the final at the Olympic Stadium, Kyiv, Ukraine.

Poland and Ukraine's bid was chosen by the UEFA Executive Committee on 18 April 2007. The two host teams qualified automatically while the remaining 14 finalists were decided through a qualifying competition, featuring 51 teams, from August 2010 to November 2011. This was the last European Championship to employ the 16-team finals format in use since 1996; from Euro 2016 onward, it was expanded to 24 finalists.

Euro 2012 was played at eight venues, four in each host country. Five new stadiums were built for the tournament, and the hosts invested heavily in improving infrastructure such as railways and roads at UEFA's request. Euro 2012 set attendance records for the 16-team format, for the highest aggregate attendance (1,440,896) and average per game (46,481).

Spain became the first team to win two consecutive European Championships, and also three straight major tournaments (Euro 2008, 2010 World Cup and Euro 2012). Spain had already gained entry to the 2013 Confederations Cup by winning the World Cup, so runners-up Italy qualified instead. As at Euro 2008 in Austria and Switzerland, both 2012 host nations were eliminated in the group stage.

There were several players ending on a total of 3 goals but because Fernando Torres made an assist and played the fewest minutes of the players who scored three goals, he was named as the Golden Boot winner for the tournament.

Bid process

The hosting of the event was initially contested by five bids representing seven countries: Croatia–Hungary, Greece, Italy, Poland–Ukraine, and Turkey. In November 2005, after an initial consideration of the bid data by UEFA, both the Greek and Turkish bids were eliminated from the process, to leave three candidates.

In May 2006, this was followed by a second round of the selection process, which included visits by UEFA to all candidates. The final decision was due to be announced on 8 December 2006 in Nyon, but this was postponed to "give bidding associations more time for the fine-tuning of their bids". On 18 April 2007, the Poland–Ukraine bid was chosen by a vote of the UEFA Executive Committee, at a meeting in Cardiff. It was the first time UEFA awarded the tournament organization to the former Eastern Bloc since Yugoslavia in 1976.

Poland–Ukraine became the third successful joint bid for the European Championship, after those of Belgium–Netherlands (2000) and Austria–Switzerland (2008). Their bid received an absolute majority of votes, and was therefore announced the winner, without requiring a second round. Italy, which received the remaining votes, had been considered favourites to win the hosting, but incidents of fan violence and a match-fixing scandal were widely cited as factors behind their failure.

There were some later alterations from the initial bid plan, regarding the venues, before UEFA confirmed the eight host cities in 2009. During the preparation process in Poland and Ukraine, UEFA repeatedly expressed concern about their preparation to host the event, with different candidates reported as being alternative hosts if they did not improve; however, in the end, UEFA affirmed their selection.

Qualification

The draw for the UEFA Euro 2012 qualifying competition took place in Warsaw on 7 February 2010. Fifty-one teams entered to compete for the fourteen remaining places in the finals, alongside co-hosts Poland and Ukraine. The teams were divided into nine groups, with the draw using the new UEFA national team coefficient for the first time in order to determine the seedings. As defending champions, Spain was automatically top-seeded. The qualifying process began in August 2010 and concluded in November 2011. At the conclusion of the qualifying group stage in October 2011, the nine group winners qualified automatically, along with the highest ranked second placed team. The remaining eight-second placed teams contested two-legged play-offs, and the four winners qualified for the finals.

Twelve of the sixteen finalists participated at the previous tournament in 2008. England and Denmark made their return to the Euro after missing out on 2008, while Republic of Ireland returned after a twenty-four-year absence to make their second appearance at a European Championship. One of the co-hosts, Ukraine, made their debut as an independent nation (before 1992 Ukraine participated as part of the Soviet Union). With the exception of Serbia – according to UEFA's ranking at the end of the qualifying stage – Europe's sixteen highest-ranked teams all qualified for the tournament.

As of 2020, this was the last time Greece qualified for the European Championship finals, and the last time Austria, Belgium, Hungary, Slovakia, Switzerland, Turkey and Wales failed to qualify.

Qualified teams
The following sixteen teams qualified for the finals:

Final draw
The draw for the final tournament took place on 2 December 2011 at the Ukraine Palace of Arts in Kyiv, Ukraine. The hour-long ceremony was hosted by Olha Freimut and Piotr Sobczyński, television presenters from the two host countries.

As was the case for the 2000, 2004 and 2008 finals, the sixteen finalists were divided into four seeding pots, using the UEFA national team coefficient ranking. The pot allocations were based on the UEFA national team coefficient rankings of the sixteen finalists at the end of the qualifying competition in November 2011. Each nation's coefficient was generated by calculating:
40% of the average ranking points per game earned in the UEFA Euro 2012 qualifying stage.
40% of the average ranking points per game earned in the 2010 FIFA World Cup qualifying stage and final tournament.
20% of the average ranking points per game earned in the UEFA Euro 2008 qualifying stage and final tournament.

Aside from the coefficient, three teams were automatically placed in Pot 1. Ukraine and Poland were both assigned to Pot 1 as the two host nations, despite the fact that their rankings were the two lowest in the tournament; this also occurred in 2008 when the co-hosts Switzerland and Austria were also ranked below all other qualified teams. As defending champions, Spain were also automatically assigned to Pot 1, though their UEFA ranking at the time of the draw was coincidentally also the best.

In the draw procedure, one team from each pot was drawn into each of the four groups. The draw also determined which place in the group teams in pots 2–4 would take (e.g. A2, A3 or A4) to create the match schedule. With Poland automatically assigned in advance to A1, and Ukraine to D1, Pot 1 only had two teams as Spain and the Netherlands were to be drawn into position one in either group B or C. The balls were drawn by four former players who had each been part of European Championship winning teams: Horst Hrubesch, Marco van Basten, Peter Schmeichel and Zinedine Zidane.

Teams were drawn consecutively into Group A to D. First, the Pot 1 teams were assigned to the first positions of their groups, while next the positions of all other teams were drawn separately from Pot 4 to 2 (for the purposes of determining the match schedules in each group).

The draw resulted in the following groups:

Venues

Eight cities were selected by UEFA as host venues. In a return to the format used at Euro 1992, Euro 1996 and Euro 2008, each of the four groups' matches were played in two stadiums. Host cities Warsaw, Gdańsk, Wrocław, Poznań, Kyiv, and Lviv are all popular tourist destinations, unlike Donetsk and Kharkiv, the latter of which replaced Dnipropetrovsk as a host city in 2009.

In order to meet UEFA's requirement for football infrastructure improvements, five new stadiums were built and opened in advance of the tournament. The remaining three stadiums (in Kyiv, Poznań and Kharkiv) underwent major renovations in order to meet UEFA's infrastructure standards. Three of the stadiums are categorised as UEFA's highest category stadiums. The transport infrastructure in Poland and Ukraine was also extensively modified on the request of UEFA to cope with the large influx of football fans.

UEFA organised fan zones in the eight host cities. They were located in the centre of each city, with all 31 matches shown live on a total of 24 giant screens. The zones enabled supporters to come together in a secure and controlled environment. The Warsaw Fan Zone occupied 120,000 square meters and accommodated 100,000 visitors. In all, the fans zones had a 20% increase in capacity compared to Euro 2008.

A total of 31 matches were played during Euro 2012, with Ukraine hosting 16 of them and Poland 15.

Ticketing
Tickets for the venues were sold directly by UEFA via its website, or distributed by the football associations of the 16 finalists. Applications had to be made during March 2011 for the 1.4 million tickets available for the 31 tournament matches. Over 20,000 were forecast to cross the Poland–Ukraine border each day during the tournament. Over 12 million applications were received, which represented a 17% increase on the 2008 finals, and an all-time record for the UEFA European Championship. Owing to this over-subscription for the matches, lotteries were carried out to allocate tickets. Prices varied from €30 (£25) (for a seat behind the goals at a group match) to €600 (£513) (for a seat in the main stand at the final). In addition to individual match tickets, fans could buy packages to see either all matches played by one team, or all matches at one specific venue.

Team base camps
Each team had a "team base camp" for its stay between the matches. From an initial list of thirty-eight potential locations (twenty-one in Poland, seventeen in Ukraine), the national associations chose their locations in 2011. The teams trained and resided in these locations throughout the tournament, travelling to games staged away from their bases. Thirteen teams stayed in Poland and three in Ukraine.

Match ball

The Adidas Tango 12 was the official match ball of UEFA Euro 2012. The ball is named after the original Adidas Tango family of footballs; however, the Tango 12 and its variations have a completely new design. Variations of the ball have been used in other contemporary competitions including the Africa Cup of Nations and the Summer Olympics. It is designed to be easier to dribble and control than the reportedly unpredictable Adidas Jabulani used at the 2010 FIFA World Cup.

Squads

Each national team had to submit a squad of 23 players, three of whom must be goalkeepers, at least ten days before the opening match of the tournament. If a player became injured or ill severely enough to prevent his participation in the tournament before his team's first match, he would be replaced by another player.

Match officials
On 20 December 2011, UEFA named twelve referees and four fourth officials for Euro 2012. On 27 March 2012, UEFA issued the full list of 80 referees to be used in Euro 2012, including the assistant referees, the additional assistant referees, and the four reserve assistant referees. Each refereeing team consisted of five match officials from the same country: one main referee, two assistant referees, and two additional assistant referees. All of the main referees, additional assistant referees, and fourth officials were FIFA referees, and the assistant referees (including the four reserve assistant referees) were FIFA assistant referees. For each refereeing team, a third assistant referee from each country was named to remain on standby until the start of the tournament to take the place of a colleague if required. In two cases, for the French and Slovenian refereeing teams, the standby assistant referees took the place of one of the assistant referees before the start of the tournament. Continuing the experiments carried out in the UEFA Champions League and UEFA Europa League, the two additional assistant referees were used on the goal line for the first time in European Championship history with approval from the International Football Association Board.

Four match officials, who served only as fourth officials, and four reserve assistant referees were also named:

Group stage

UEFA announced the schedule for the 31 matches of the final tournament in October 2010, with the final confirmation of kick-offs times being affirmed following the tournament draw in December 2011.

The teams finishing in the top two positions in each of the four groups progressed to the quarter-finals, while the bottom two teams were eliminated from the tournament.

Tiebreakers
If two or more teams were equal on points on completion of the group matches, the following tie-breaking criteria were applied:
 Higher number of points obtained in the matches played between the teams in question;
 Superior goal difference resulting from the matches played between the teams in question;
 Higher number of goals scored in the matches played between the teams in question;
 If, after having applied criteria 1 to 3, teams still had an equal ranking (e.g. if criteria 1 to 3 were applied to three teams that were level on points initially and these criteria separated one team from the other two who still have an equal ranking), criteria 1 to 3 would be reapplied exclusively to the matches between the teams who were still level to determine their final rankings. If this procedure did not lead to a decision, criteria 5 to 9 would apply;
 Superior goal difference in all group matches;
 Higher number of goals scored in all group matches;
 If two teams tie alone (according to 1–5) after having met in the last round of the group stage their ranking is determined by penalty shoot-out.
 Position in the UEFA national team coefficient ranking system;
 Fair play conduct of the teams (final tournament);
 Drawing of lots.

Group A

Group B

Group C

Group D

Knockout phase

In the knockout phase, extra time and a penalty shoot-out were used to decide the winner if necessary.

As with every tournament since UEFA Euro 1984, there was no third place play-off.

Bracket

Quarter-finals

Semi-finals

Final

Statistics

Goalscorers

Awards

UEFA Team of the Tournament
The UEFA Technical Team was charged with naming a squad composed of the 23 best players over the course of the tournament. The group of eleven analysts watched every game at the tournament before making their decision after the final. Ten players from the winning Spanish team were selected in the team of the tournament, while Zlatan Ibrahimović was the only player to be included whose team was knocked out in the group stage.

Golden Boot
Fernando Torres tied with five other players on goals and with Mario Gómez on goals and assists; however, he played 92 fewer minutes than Gómez did, thus earning the title. Torres also became the first player to score in two finals.
 Fernando Torres (3 goals)

UEFA Player of the Tournament
 Andrés Iniesta

Prize money

A total of €196 million was given to the 16 teams competing in this tournament, an increase from the €184 million in the previous tournament. Each team received an initial €8 million and then received additional money, based on their performances. Spain, the winners of Euro 2012, were awarded a total prize of €23 million for their performance. The maximum prize achievable (for winning all group matches and winning the final) was €23.5 million. 

Complete list:

Prize for participating: €8 million
Extra payment based on teams performances:
 Champions: €7.5 million
 Runner-up: €4.5 million
 Reaching the semi-finals: €3 million
 Reaching the quarter-finals: €2 million
 Finishing in third place in a group: €1 million
 Winning a group match: €1 million
 Drawing a group match: €500,000

Besides money, commemorative plaques were given to all participants together with special plaques for semi-final losers and finalists.
Gold and silver medals were awarded to the winners and runners-up, respectively, whereas both semi-final losers were awarded bronze medals. The trophy given to the winners remains in the ownership of UEFA; however, the winning nation, Spain, received a full-size replica.

Discipline
In the final tournament, a player was suspended for the subsequent match in the competition for either getting red card or accumulating two yellow cards in two different matches. UEFA's Control and Disciplinary body has the ability to increase the automatic one match ban for a red card (e.g. for violent conduct). Single yellow card cautions were erased at the conclusion of the quarter-finals, and were not carried over to the semi-finals (so that a player could only be suspended for the final by getting a red card in the semi-final). Single yellow cards and suspensions for yellow card accumulations do not carry over to the 2014 FIFA World Cup qualification tournament matches. The following players were suspended during the final tournament – for one or more games – as a result of red cards or yellow card accumulations:

Apart from discipline measures for yellow and red cards, UEFA fined the football associations of Croatia, England, Germany, Portugal, Russia, and Spain a total of €417,000 for spectators incidents. Furthermore, the Portuguese association was fined €5,000 for delaying the start of the second half of the game against Germany. In addition to these, Danish striker Nicklas Bendtner was fined €100,000 and given a one match ban (to be applied in the 2014 FIFA World Cup qualification tournament) for revealing his sponsored underpants, violating UEFA regulations, during the celebration of his second goal in the match against Portugal. His fine was later paid by his sponsor.

Marketing

Trophy tour

The Henri Delaunay Trophy began a journey through the host cities seven weeks before the start of the tournament. A hundred days before the first match a  hot air balloon in the shape of the trophy was flown in Nyon, Switzerland and visited 14 cities throughout the host countries, reminding spectators of the impending tournament. On 20 April 2012, the trophy tour started and visited the Polish cities of Warsaw, Wrocław, Gdańsk, Poznań, Kraków, Katowice and Łódź. After the Polish cities, the trophy visited seven Ukrainian cities: Kyiv, Ivano-Frankivsk, Kharkiv, Donetsk, Dnipropetrovsk, Lviv, and Odesa.

Logo, slogan and theme songs
The competition slogan, Creating History Together (literally, "Together we are creating the future", Tvorymo istoriyu razom), was announced along with the logo. The official logo for the tournament was unveiled at a special event at Mykhailivska Square, Kyiv, on 14 December 2009 and was designed by Portuguese group Brandia Central. It took its visual identity from Wycinanki or Vytynanky, a traditional form of paper cutting practised in rural areas of Poland and Ukraine. The art form symbolises the nature of the rural areas of both countries. As part of the event, landmark buildings in the eight host cities were illuminated with the tournament logo.

The official Euro 2012 song was "Endless Summer" by the German singer Oceana. In addition, UEFA retained the melody that was composed by Rollo Armstrong of Faithless on its behalf for the 2008 tournament. The Republic of Ireland also produced an official song: "The Rocky Road to Poland", recorded by a collaboration of Irish performers, quickly reached number 1 in Ireland and stayed there for three weeks. In Spain, the broadcasting company Mediaset España commissioned the song "No hay 2 sin 3", performed by David Bisbal and Cali & El Dandee and produced by RedOne.

The tournament was also associated with the song "Heart of Courage" by Two Steps from Hell, which was played in the stadiums during the entrance of the players (before the national anthems); and also "Seven Nation Army" by The White Stripes, in this case after every goal.

Merchandise and mascots

UEFA signed a worldwide licensing agreement with Warner Brothers Consumer Products to help promote the tournament. The agreement involved licensing to third parties for a variety of other merchandising items.

Also designed by Warner Bros. were the official tournament mascots, "Slavek and Slavko", twins that wore the national colours of the two host nations. The mascots were unveiled in December 2010, and named following an online poll.

Video game
The UEFA Euro 2012 video game was released by EA Sports as a downloadable expansion pack for FIFA 12.

Sponsorship
UEFA announced ten global sponsors and, for both Poland and Ukraine, three national sponsors as shown below. These sponsorships together with the broadcasting revenues were estimated to earn UEFA at least US$1.6 billion.

Broadcasting

According to UEFA requirements, TP ensured approximately 2х70 Gbit/s data communication speed from Polish stadiums and 2х140 Gbit/s between Poland and Ukraine. This was required due to the fact that the matches were broadcast in HD quality. The multilateral production utilised 31 cameras to cover the action on and around the pitch at every match, with additional cameras following activities around the game, such as team arrivals at the stadiums, interviews, and media conferences. The official Euro 2012 broadcasting centre was located at the Expo XXI International Centre in Warsaw. The tournament was broadcast live by around 100 TV channels covering the whole world. 150,000,000 people were expected to watch the matches each day.

Concerns and controversies

After Poland and Ukraine were chosen by a vote of the UEFA Executive Committee as host countries for Euro 2012, several issues arose, which jeopardised the Polish/Ukrainian host status.

In Ukraine there were financial difficulties related to stadium and infrastructure renovation related to the economic crisis. In Poland, issues arose related to corruption within the Polish Football Association. In April 2009 however, the president of UEFA, Michel Platini announced that all was on track and that he saw no major problems. After a UEFA delegation visited Ukraine in September 2011, he stated the country was "virtually ready for Euro 2012".

In the UK, there were allegations of racism in football in both host countries. The main cause of discussion was the BBC current affairs programme Panorama, entitled Euro 2012: Stadiums of Hate, which included recent footage of supporters chanting various antisemitic slogans and displays of white power symbols and banners in Poland, plus Nazi salutes and the beating of South Asians in Ukraine. The documentary was first echoed in much of the British press, but was then attacked for being one-sided and unethical: critics included other British media outlets; anti-racism campaigners, black and Jewish community leaders in Poland; Polish and Ukrainian politicians and journalists; England fans visiting the host nations and Gary Lineker, a British football star.

In response to Yulia Tymoshenko's hunger strike and her mistreatment in a Ukrainian prison some European politicians and governments announced that they would boycott the matches in Ukraine.

Ukraine came under criticism from animal welfare organisations for killing stray cats and dogs in order to prepare for Euro 2012. Ukrainian Ministry of Ecology and Natural Resources and Minister of the Environment promised to take action to prevent killing animals but it still remains unclear how these measures were enforced. The ministry's comments also suggested this would only be a temporary measure, drawing further criticism.

Bomb explosions took place in Dnipropetrovsk, Ukraine, on 27 April 2012 and were described as a terrorist attack that may jeopardise the organisation of the tournament in Ukraine.

Other important issues were associated with FEMEN's group protests against prostitution and sex tourism in Ukraine, and enormous increases in hotel prices by many hoteliers in the country.

In total, four nations were fined by UEFA for racist activities by their fans (none of them were hosts): Germany, Spain, Croatia and Russia.

Notes

References

External links

 
 UEFA Euro 2012 at UEFA.com
 Official Technical Report

 
2012
2011–12 in European football
2011–12 in Polish football
2011–12 in Ukrainian football
2012
2012
Poland–Ukraine relations
June 2012 sports events in Europe
July 2012 sports events in Europe